Thomas Finch, 2nd Earl of Winchilsea (13 June 1578 – 4 November 1639) was an English peer and Member of Parliament.

Early life
Finch was the third, but second surviving, son of Sir Moyle Finch, 1st Baronet and Elizabeth Heneage, 1st Countess of Winchilsea. Among his siblings were Sir Theophilius Finch, 2nd Baronet, Lady Anne Finch (who married Sir William Twysden, 1st Baronet), Hon. Sir Heneage Finch (Speaker of the House of Commons), Hon. Francis Finch (MP for Eye), and Lady Catherine Finch (who married Sir John Wentworth, 1st Baronet, of Gosfield).

His paternal grandparents were the former Catherine Moyle (a daughter of Sir Thomas Moyle). and Sir Thomas Finch and his uncle was Henry Finch (MP for Canterbury and St Albans). His maternal grandparents were the former Anne Poyntz (daughter of Sir Nicholas Poyntz) and Sir Thomas Heneage, who was Chancellor of the Duchy of Lancaster and Vice-Chamberlain of the Household in the latter years of the reign of Elizabeth I.

Career
Finch represented the constituencies of Winchelsea from 1621 to 1622 and Kent from 1628 to 1629 as a Member of Parliament.

Upon the death of his elder brother Sir Theophilus Finch, 2nd Baronet in 1619, Finch inherited his father's baronetcy. Later, he inherited the earldom of Winchilsea from his mother Elizabeth Finch, 1st Countess of Winchilsea on her death in 1634.

Personal life
In 1609, he married Cecille Wentworth, a daughter of John Wentworth of Gosfield Hall, High Sheriff of Essex, and Cecille Unton (dau. and eventual co-heiress of Sir Edward Unton). They had a son and three daughters, including:

 Heneage Finch, 3rd Earl of Winchilsea (–1689), the British Ambassador to the Ottoman Empire who married Hon. Diana Willoughby, eldest daughter of Francis Willoughby, 5th Baron Willoughby in 1645. After her death in 1672, he married Catherine ( Norcliffe) Wentworth, widow of Christopher Lister and Sir John Wentworth (and daughter of Sir Thomas Norcliffe) in 1673. After her death in 1678, he married Elizabeth Ayres, only daughter and heiress of John Ayres, in 1681.

Lord Winchilsea died on 4 November 1639 and was succeeded in his titles by his only son, Heneage.

References

External links

02
1578 births
1639 deaths
Thomas
16th-century English nobility
17th-century English nobility
English MPs 1621–1622
English MPs 1628–1629